Hutton Settlement District is a historic district near Spokane, Washington.  It was first listed on the NRHP in 1976 as Hutton Settlement.  It had  with 12 contributing buildings and four contributing structures.  It was expanded by 304 acres and renamed in 1994.

History

The Hutton Settlement is an orphanage institution founded and endowed by mining magnate Levi W. Hutton in 1919. Following much research and a nationwide tour of orphanages for inspiration on the best orphanage design and organizational structure, a settlement on a  plot was designed to function as a working farm with an administration building and four “cottages” on the campus. As an orphan himself, “Daddy Hutton” as he became known, took a great interest in all aspects of the Settlement and was very involved in the planning, building, administration, and operation of the facilities until his death in 1928.

See also
 Morning Star Boys' Ranch

References

External links

Hutton Settlement Children’s Home Official Website

Tudor Revival architecture in Washington (state)
Spokane County, Washington
Historic districts on the National Register of Historic Places in Washington (state)
National Register of Historic Places in Spokane County, Washington